Ned Segal (born ) is an American business executive. He was the chief financial officer of Twitter from 2017 to 2022. He was fired, along with three other top executives, on October 27, 2022, following Elon Musk’s purchase of the company.

Early life and education 
Segal was born . He graduated from Lick-Wilmerding High School in 1992 and earned a Bachelor of Science degree in Spanish from Georgetown University.

Career 
From 1996 to April 2013, Segal worked at Goldman Sachs including as the managing director and head of global software investment banking from 2009 to 2013. Segal was later the chief financial officer (CFO) of the RPX Corporation. Until 2017, Segal was the senior vice president of finance for the small business group at Intuit. In late August 2017, he succeeded Anthony Noto as the chief financial officer of Twitter. In late October 2022, Segal was one of several executives who were fired after the acquisition of Twitter by Elon Musk. He reportedly received a golden parachute worth .

Segal is on the board of directors of Beyond Meat and serves on its audit committee.

Personal life 
Segal lives in San Francisco with his wife and three children.

References

External links

Living people
1970s births
Year of birth missing (living people)
Place of birth missing (living people)
Georgetown University alumni
Twitter, Inc. people
Goldman Sachs people
Intuit people
American chief financial officers
21st-century American businesspeople
Businesspeople from San Francisco